American rock band Paramore have recorded songs for five studio albums, a box set, an extended play and two soundtrack albums. In 2002, at age 13, vocalist Hayley Williams moved to Franklin, Tennessee, where she met brothers Josh Farro and Zac Farro. The band was officially formed by Josh Farro (lead guitar and backing vocals), Zac Farro (drums), Jeremy Davis (bass guitar) and Hayley Williams (lead vocals) in 2004, with the later addition of Williams' neighbor Jason Bynum (rhythm guitar). In 2005, Paramore signed with the New York City-based Fueled by Ramen but Davis would soon after leave, and be replaced with John Hembree. The band released their debut album entitled All We Know Is Falling that year. Three singles were released to promote the album. Davis would rejoin shortly after.

Bynum left the band in 2005. Hunter lamb replaced Bynum in 2006 but later left the band. Davis would be removed from the band for a second time, but shortly rejoined once more. Taylor York, who had been in a band with the Farro brothers before the two met Hayley Williams, joined as a touring guitarist in 2007. The band released their second album, Riot!, in 2007. The lead single, "Misery Business", became their first charting single in the Billboard Hot 100 and certified single. The next year, Paramore contributed to the Twilight film soundtrack with two original songs, including the hit single "Decode".

In 2009, the band released their third studio album, also announcing that York would become an official member, Brand New Eyes. Williams and Josh Farro wrote most of the songs together, while York had writing credits in some of them. After promotion for Brand New Eyes ended, the Farro brothers announced their departure of the band in 2010. In 2011, Paramore recorded an original song for the Transformers: Dark of the Moon film soundtrack and released a box set entitled Singles Club with three original songs, "In The Mourning", "Renegade", and "Hello Cold World". In 2013, they released their fourth studio album, Paramore, which debuted at number one on Billboard 200. The album produced two of Paramore's biggest hits "Still into You" and "Ain't It Fun". Davis would later leave in 2015 but Zac Farro would return in 2017. In May 2017, they released their fifth album After Laughter. Four singles have been released for this album, "Hard Times", "Told You So", "Fake Happy", and "Rose-Colored Boy".

The band returned after a four year hiatus with their single "This Is Why" on September 28, 2022, from their 2023  album of the same name. The full album was released on February 10, 2023.

Songs

References 

General
 
 
 

Specific

External links 
 The official website of Paramore

 
Paramore